James Henry Charles Jones (16 April 1918 – 20 April 2002) was an Australian rules footballer who played with Carlton in the Victorian Football League (VFL).

Notes

External links 

Jim Jones's profile at Blueseum

1918 births
2002 deaths
Carlton Football Club players
Australian rules footballers from Victoria (Australia)